Bruno Daniel Marie Paul Retailleau (born 20 November 1960) is a French politician who has presided over The Republicans group in the Senate since 2014. He has represented the Vendée department in the Senate since 2004. Retailleau also served as President of the General Council of Vendée from 2010 to 2015 and President of the Regional Council of Pays de la Loire from 2015 until 2017.

Early life and education
Son of a grain merchant, he was born on November 20, 1960 in Cholet, Maine-et-Loire.

Elder of a family of 4 children, he grew up in Saint-Malô-du-Bois, a village in the bocage of Vendée, 7 kilometers from where the Puy du Fou historical theme park will emerge.

Retailleau graduated from Sciences Po in 1985, after a master's degree in economics at the University of Nantes.

Professional career
In 1985, he became deputy general manager of a local radio station Alouette, then, from 1987 to 1994, general manager of the Sciencescom communication school, later integrated into the Audencia Business School.

When the Grand Parc du Puy du Fou corporation was created, which manages the theme park associated with the "Cinéscénie", he became its first chairman of the board.

Political career

Early beginnings
A member of the Movement for France (MPF) until 2010, Retailleau became the Vendée General Councillor for the canton of Mortagne-sur-Sèvre in 1988, a position he retained until 2015.

Member of the National Assembly 
He became the member of the National Assembly for the fourth constituency of Vendée in 1994 upon the election of Philippe de Villiers as a Member of the European Parliament (MEP), a position he did not seek election again in the 1997 election, as De Villiers was running for his old seat.

Member of the Senate
Instead, Retailleau joined the Senate in 2004, where he has been serving as chairman of the Republicans' group since 2014. In 2010, he succeeded De Villiers as President of the General Council of Vendée. In 2012, he joined the Union for a Popular Movement (UMP).

President of the Regional Council of Pays de la Loire
In the 2015 regional elections, Retailleau led a list in Pays de la Loire with the support of The Republicans (LR) and the Union of Democrats and Independents (UDI), which received over 42% of the vote in the second round. He supported the Aéroport du Grand Ouest project. On 18 December 2015, he became President of the Regional Council of Pays de la Loire, an office he resigned from in 2017 to focus on his activities in the Senate.

In the Republicans' 2016 primaries, Retailleau endorsed François Fillon as the party's candidate for the 2017 French presidential election. He subsequently joined Fillon's team as campaign coordinator.

Right-wing primary
Ahead of the Republicans' leadership election in 2019, Retailleau announced that he would run for the position as the party's chair. He gives up his candidacy in August 2021.

At the Republicans’ national convention in December 2021, Retailleau was part of the 11-member committee which oversaw the party's selection of its candidate for the 2022 presidential elections.

Candidate for the presidency of the Republicans
On September 2, 2022, Retailleau is a candidate for the presidency of The Republicans party, whose election will be held in early December. He was defeated by Éric Ciotti on 11 December 2022.

Political positions
Bruno Retailleau claims to belong to a right wing that assumes its values. A supporter of a clear opposition to Emmanuel Macron, he refuses any government agreement with him.

Regularly described as a liberal-conservative, he advocates major reforms of work, the state and the French social model, and calls for "a policy of civilization" against woke indoctrination. A proponent of a firmer response to security issues, Bruno Retailleau defends a "penal revolution" including measures such as the introduction of short prison sentences for the first acts of delinquency, the lowering of the age of criminal majority to 16 years and the suspension of social and family aid for parents who do not assume their educational responsibilities. Attached to French sovereignty, he regularly denounces the influence of European jurisprudence such as the ECHR, was opposed to the Treaty of Lisbon and refuses any federalist rush to the European Union.

Advocating for "an intellectual refoundation" of the right, Bruno Retailleau aims to give back an ideological corpus to his political family and calls on the right to seize new issues such as environmentalism, to which he has devoted a book.

In a joint letter initiated by Norbert Röttgen and Anthony Gonzalez ahead of the 47th G7 summit in 2021, Retailleau joined some 70 legislators from Europe, the US and Japan in calling upon their leaders to take a tough stance on China and to "avoid becoming dependent" on the country for technology including artificial intelligence and 5G.

Personal life
Married to a medical doctor, Retailleau is the father of three children.

Passionate about horseback riding, Retailleau was spotted by Philippe de Villiers while participating as a volunteer rider in the "Cinéscénie" show at the Puy du Fou. The creator of the show, who quickly made him his second in command, later entrusted him with the staging of the Cinescénie for nearly 25 years.

Bibliography

Books

References

External links
 Page on the Senate website

1960 births
Living people
20th-century French politicians
21st-century French politicians
Presidents of the Regional Council of Pays de la Loire
Politicians from Pays de la Loire
Movement for France politicians
Union for a Popular Movement politicians
The Republicans (France) politicians
French Senators of the Fifth Republic
Deputies of the 10th National Assembly of the French Fifth Republic
University of Nantes alumni
Sciences Po alumni
Senators of Vendée
People from Cholet
Departmental councillors (France)
Presidents of French departments